Gormgal of Ardoileán, Connemara, died 1017/1018.

Biography
Gormgal is credited with building a number of monastic settlements in the late 10th century. Noted as an anchorite of exceptional sanctity, he made the island famous, so much so that in 1014 Brian Boru visited High Island to make his confession to him. A well on the island is named after Brian.

Gormgal's monastery ceased to exist sometime in the following centuries but High Island remained a destination for pilgrims. His feast day is 5 August.

See also
 Féchín of Fore died 665.
 Enda of Aran, died c. 530.
 Ceannanach, missionary, fl. c. 490-500?
 Gillagori Ua Dubhacan, Abbot of Aran, died 1167.

References
 High Island:An Irish Monastery in the Atlantic, Jenny White Marshall and Grellan D. Rourke, 2000.
 A Guide to Connemara's Early Christian Sites, Anthony Previté, Oughterard, 2008. 

Christian clergy from County Galway
11th-century Irish priests
1010s deaths
Year of birth unknown